The 1916 Brooklyn Robins won their first National League pennant in 16 years and advanced to the first World Series in franchise history, where they lost to Babe Ruth and the Boston Red Sox in five games.

Offseason 
 February 10, 1916: Jim Hickman was purchased by the Robins from the Baltimore Terrapins.
 February 10, 1916: Mike Mowrey was purchased by the Robins from the Pittsburgh Rebels.

Regular season

Season standings

Record vs. opponents

Notable transactions 
 August 25, 1916: Lew McCarty was traded by the Robins to the New York Giants for Fred Merkle.

Roster

Player stats

Batting

Starters by position 
Note: Pos = Position; G = Games played; AB = At bats; R = Runs; H = Hits; Avg. = Batting average; HR = Home runs; RBI = Runs batted in; SB = Stolen bases

Other batters 
Note: G = Games played; AB = At bats; R = Runs; H = Hits; Avg. = Batting average; HR = Home runs; RBI = Runs batted in; SB = Stolen bases

Pitching

Starting pitchers 
Note: G = Games pitched; GS = Games started; CG = Complete games; IP = Innings pitched; W = Wins; L = Losses; ERA = Earned run average; BB = Bases on balls; SO = Strikeouts

Other pitchers 
Note: G = Games pitched; GS = Games started; CG = Complete games; IP = Innings pitched; W = Wins; L = Losses; ERA = Earned run average; BB = Bases on balls; SO = Strikeouts

Relief pitchers 
Note: G = Games pitched; IP = Innings pitched; W = Wins; L = Losses; SV = Saves; ERA = Earned run average; BB = Bases on balls; SO = Strikeouts

1916 World Series

Game 1 
October 7, 1916, at Braves Field in Boston, Massachusetts

Game 2 
October 9, 1916, at Braves Field in Boston, Massachusetts

Game 3 
October 10, 1916, at Ebbets Field in Brooklyn, New York

Game 4 
October 11, 1916, at Ebbets Field in Brooklyn, New York

Game 5 
October 12, 1916, at Braves Field in Boston, Massachusetts

Awards and honors

League top five finishers 
Larry Cheney
 #2 in NL in strikeouts (166)

Jake Daubert
 #2 in NL in batting average (.316)
 #4 in NL in on-base percentage (.371)

Rube Marquard
 #2 in NL in ERA (1.58)

Jeff Pfeffer
 #2 in NL in wins (25)
 #2 in NL in complete games (30)

Zach Wheat
 Led NL in slugging percentage (.461)
 #2 in NL in doubles (32)

Notes

References 
Baseball-Reference season page
Baseball Almanac season page

External links 
1916 Brooklyn Robins uniform
Brooklyn Dodgers reference site
Acme Dodgers page 
Retrosheet

Los Angeles Dodgers seasons
Brooklyn Robins season
National League champion seasons
Brooklyn Robins season
1910s in Brooklyn
Flatbush, Brooklyn